Litaker Township is one of fourteen townships in Rowan County, North Carolina, United States. The township had a population of 10,299 according to the 2000 census.

Geographically, Litaker Township occupies  in south-central Rowan County.  Incorporated municipalities here include Faith and small portions of the city of  Salisbury, the county seat of Rowan County.  The township's southern border is with Cabarrus County.

Townships in Rowan County, North Carolina
Townships in North Carolina